Edward Eugene Tarr (May 2, 1880 – August 13, 1950) was an American football and basketball coach.

Coaching career
Tarr was the head football coach at Adrian College in Adrian, Michigan. He held that position for the 1903 and 1904 seasons. His coaching record at Adrian was 7–6. He was also coached at Mercer University for the 1906 season where he compiled a record of 2–3. He was Mercer's first paid coach.

Tarr was a graduate of McDaniel College (then known as Western Maryland College) in 1903. He spent some time coaching in Alabama, Arkansas, and at the Carlisle Indian School. He served as the head football coach at Little Rock Central High School in 1910.

Head coaching record

College football

References

1880 births
1950 deaths
Adrian Bulldogs baseball coaches
Adrian Bulldogs football coaches
Adrian Bulldogs men's basketball coaches
Bethany Bison football coaches
Mercer Bears football coaches
High school football coaches in Arkansas
High school football coaches in Virginia
Western Maryland College alumni